Live at Rockpalast may refer to:

 Live at Rockpalast (Dalbello album)
 Live at Rockpalast (Joe Bonamassa album)
 Live at Rockpalast (Joe Jackson album)
 Live at Rockpalast (John Cale album)